Myrmecophilus pergandei, the eastern ant cricket, is a species of ant cricket in the family Myrmecophilidae. It is found in North America.

References

Crickets
Orthoptera of North America
Insects described in 1884
Articles created by Qbugbot